Blundellsands & Crosby railway station is a railway station in the Blundellsands area of Merseyside, England. It also serves the adjacent town of Crosby. It is situated on the Northern Line of the Merseyrail network.

History
Blundellsands & Crosby opened in 1848 as an intermediate station on the Liverpool, Crosby and Southport Railway. It became part of the Lancashire and Yorkshire Railway (LYR) on 14 June 1855 who took over from the (LCSR). The Lancashire and Yorkshire Railway amalgamated with the London and North Western Railway on 1 January 1922 and in turn was Grouped into the London, Midland and Scottish Railway in 1923. Nationalisation followed in 1948 and in 1978 the station became part of the Merseyrail network's Northern Line (operated by British Rail until privatisation in 1995).

Facilities
The station underwent a revamp at a cost of £250,000 in 2009, including the installation of electronic timetables, in July that year. The refurbishment included a new toilet with disabled access, changes to the waiting rooms such as automatic doors, CCTV, new flooring, seats, new windows and heating. In 2010 a new 101-space car park was constructed on the site of the previous one, including new surfacing, marked bays, lighting and landscaping. There is also cycle racks for 30 cycles and secure cycle storage for 74 cycles.

Services
Trains operate every 15 minutes throughout the day from Monday to Saturday. On summer Sundays, they travel to Southport in the north and to Hunts Cross in Liverpool via Liverpool Central in the south. Winter Sunday services travel every 30 minutes in each direction.

Gallery

References

External links

Railway stations in the Metropolitan Borough of Sefton
DfT Category E stations
Former Lancashire and Yorkshire Railway stations
Railway stations in Great Britain opened in 1848
Railway stations served by Merseyrail